Aalukkoru Aasai is an Indian Tamil-language comedy drama film directed by V. Sekhar, starring Sathyaraj, Meena and Vadivelu.

Synopsis 

Arivazhagan is a man who dreams of marrying an educated, employed girl, building a dream house of his own, and having one child. Due to a trick of his scheming orthodox grandparents, he instead finds himself married to Angala – an illiterate rustic whose dreams are confined to marrying a swarthy man, having a dozen kids and visiting temples. Her dreams came true and Arivazhagan's dreams of a modern lifestyle are destroyed one by one. Meanwhile, Arivazhagan's friend Pazhani hoodwinks his own wife Govindamma Pazhani and has many affairs. As the two men cheat on their wives, a hooker Manthara develops a soft spot for Sathyaraj. Eventually, Arivazhagan and Pazhani leave their family and stay at Manthara's house for a short period. In the end, Arivazhagan happily goes back to his wife

Cast 
 Sathyaraj as Arivazhagan
Meena as Angala Parmeshweri (Eshwari)
Raasi as Manthra
Vadivelu as Pazhani
Kalpana as Govindamma Pazhani
Senthil as Arivazhagan's grandfather
Vadivukkarasi as Arivazhagan's grandmother
Delhi Ganesh as Eshwari's father
Sindhu as Eshwari's stepmother
Master Mahendran as Saravanan, Pazhani's son
Minnal Deepa as Sheela

Production 
Sneha was approached for the lead role but she refused to pair with Sathyaraj and she was replaced by Meena pairing with Sathyaraj for the fourth time.

Soundtrack 
The soundtrack was composed by S. A. Rajkumar, while lyrics were written by Ravi Bharathi, Pazhani Bharathi, Pa. Vijay, Kabilan and Nandalala. New Straits Times cited Rajkumar "lost his magic" and called the songs "below average".

Reception 
Bizhat wrote "The whole film looks like a stage play and all the characters speak lengthy dialogues, testing one's patience. In this age of technological advancement, the director V. Shekar takes us forty years back with his story and screenplay". BBthots.com wrote "Aalukkoru Aasai seems suspiciously like a movie that was started with only the basic premise of conflict in hand and no ideas about the resolution of the conflict. The movie sets up an interesting situation and even manages to raise some laughs along the way. But it then gets lost completely and never recovers. The director has no clue about the direction to adopt, whether with the storyline or with the characters of the main players. The result is a movie with a confusing story-line and characters that are stupid and easy to dislike". Chennai Online wrote "it looked like director V. Sekhar had the potential plot to build upon his story-line and to justify his title. But it doesn't quite turn out that way! After the initial promise, the script soon loses focus, the issues get muddled, and the dreams and desires of the characters take a back seat".

References

External links 

2003 films
2000s Tamil-language films
Indian comedy-drama films
Films scored by S. A. Rajkumar
Films directed by V. Sekhar
2003 comedy-drama films